Martin Punitzer (7 July 1889 in Berlin – 7 October 1949 in Santiago de Chile aged 60, complete name: Martin Albrecht Punitzer) was a German architect of the New Objectivity, who worked in Berlin in the 1920s. In the 1930s, he was persecuted as a Jew by the Nazis and had to emigrate to Chile.

Realisations 

 1923/1924: Villa Schönbach, Württembergallee 31 in Berlin-Westend
 1924: Umgestaltung seines Elternhauses, des Eckhauses Turmstraße 76 / Ottostraße 21 in Berlin-Moabit
 1928/1929: Fabrikgebäude der Robert Abrahamsohn GmbH (later Elektro-Mechanik), Nicolaistraße 7 in Berlin-Lankwitz
 1928/1929: Wohnhaus für den Unternehmer Robert Abrahamsohn, Calandrellistraße 45 in Berlin-Lankwitz
 1928/1929: , Hauptstraße 78/79 in Berlin-Friedenau
 1932: Fabrikanlage der Werkzeugmaschinenfabrik Herbert Lindner, Lübarser Straße in Berlin-Wittenau
 1932: Fabrikgebäude der Hellas Zigarettenfabrik for Evangelos Papastratos, Gerichtstraße 27 in Berlin-Wedding
 1935/1936: Fabrikgebäude der Maschinenfabrik M. E. Queitzsch KG, Oranienburger Straße 170 und 172 in Berlin-Wittenau

Further reading 
 Clemens Klemmer: Anonyme Architektur der Moderne. Zum Werk des Architekten Martin Punitzer (1889–1949). In: Werk, Bauen + Wohnen, Nr. 76/43, Ausgabe 11/1989, .
 Jürgen Lampeitl, Albert Ude, Wolf-Borwin Wendlandt: Martin Albrecht Punitzer, Architekt – eine Collage. Verlag Albert Ude, Gelsenkirchen 1987. 
 Punitzer, Martin. In Myra Warhaftig: Deutsche jüdische Architekten vor und nach 1933. Reimer, Berlin 2005, .

References

External links 

 
 Skizzen, Bauzeichnungen und Architekturfotos im Nachlass von Martin Punitzer im Archivbestand des  (AMTUB)
 Martin Punitzer auf der Website zur Ausstellung Forgotten Architects, Pentagram Design, London 2007.

20th-century German architects
Emigrants from Nazi Germany
1889 births
1949 deaths
Architects from Berlin
German emigrants to Chile